In mechanical engineering, the Denavit–Hartenberg parameters (also called DH parameters) are the four parameters associated with a particular convention for attaching reference frames to the links of a spatial kinematic chain, or robot manipulator.

Jacques Denavit and Richard Hartenberg introduced this convention in 1955 in order to standardize the coordinate frames for spatial linkages.

Richard Paul demonstrated its value for the kinematic analysis of robotic systems in 1981.
While many conventions for attaching reference frames have been developed, the Denavit–Hartenberg convention remains a popular approach.

Denavit–Hartenberg convention
A commonly used convention for selecting frames of reference in robotics applications is the Denavit and Hartenberg (D–H) convention which was introduced by Jacques Denavit and Richard S. Hartenberg.  In this convention, coordinate frames are attached to the joints between two links such that one transformation is associated with the joint, and the second is associated with the link .  The coordinate transformations along a serial robot consisting of  links form the kinematics equations of the robot,

where  is the transformation locating the end-link.

A typical serial robot is characterized by a sequence of six lines , one for each joint in the robot. The system of six joint axes  and five common normal lines  form the kinematic skeleton of the typical six degree of freedom serial robot. Denavit and Hartenberg introduced the convention that z-coordinate axes are assigned to the joint axes  and x-coordinate axes are assigned to the common normals .

This convention allows the definition of the movement of links around a common joint axis  by the screw displacement,

where  and  define the physical dimensions of the link in terms of the angle measured around and distance measured along the X axis.

In summary, the reference frames are laid out as follows:
 the -axis is in the direction of the joint axis
 the -axis is parallel to the common normal:  (or away from )If there is no unique common normal (parallel  axes), then  (below) is a free parameter.
 the -axis follows from the - and -axis by choosing it to be a right-handed coordinate system.

Four parameters 

The following four transformation parameters are known as D–H parameters:.

 : offset along previous  to the common normal
 : angle about previous , from old  to new 
 : length of the common normal (aka , but if using this notation, do not confuse with ).  Assuming a revolute joint, this is the radius about previous .
 : angle about common normal, from old  axis to new  axis

A visualization of D–H parameterization is available: YouTube

There is some choice in frame layout as to whether the previous  axis or the next  points along the common normal.  The latter system allows branching chains more efficiently, as multiple frames can all point away from their common ancestor, but in the alternative layout the ancestor can only point toward one successor.  Thus the commonly used notation places each down-chain  axis collinear with the common normal, yielding the transformation calculations shown below.

We can note constraints on the relationships between the axes:

 the -axis intersects both  and  axes

Denavit–Hartenberg matrix
It is common to separate a screw displacement into product of a pure translation along a line and a pure rotation about the line, so that

and

Using this notation, each link can be described by a coordinate transformation from the concurrent coordinate system to the previous coordinate system.

 

Note that this is the product of two screw displacements,  The matrices associated with these operations are:

 

 

 

 

This gives:

 

where  R is the 3×3 submatrix describing rotation and  T is the 3×1 submatrix describing translation.

In some books, the order of transformation for a pair of consecutive rotation and translation (such as and ) is replaced. However, because matrix multiplication order for such pair does not matter, the result is the same. For example: .

Use of Denavit and Hartenberg matrices
The Denavit and Hartenberg notation gives a standard (distal) methodology to write the kinematic equations of a manipulator. This is especially useful for serial manipulators where a matrix is used to represent the pose (position and orientation) of one body with respect to another.

The position of body  with respect to   may be represented by a position matrix indicated with the symbol  or 
 

This matrix is also used to transform a point from frame  to 

 
Where the upper left  submatrix of  represents the relative
orientation of the two bodies, and the upper right  represents their relative position or more specifically the body position in frame n − 1 represented with element of frame n.

 

An important property of Denavit and Hartenberg matrices is that the inverse is

where  is both the transpose and the inverse of the orthogonal matrix , i.e. .

Kinematics
Further matrices can be defined to represent velocity and acceleration of bodies.
The velocity of body  with respect to body  can be represented in frame  by the matrix

where  is the angular velocity of body  with respect to body  and all the components are expressed in frame ;  is the velocity of one point of body  with respect to body  (the pole). The pole is the point of  passing through the origin of frame .

The acceleration matrix can be defined as the sum of the time derivative of the velocity plus the velocity squared

The velocity and the acceleration in frame  of a point of body  can be evaluated as

It is also possible to prove that

Velocity and acceleration matrices add up according to the following rules

in other words the absolute velocity is the sum of the parent velocity plus the relative velocity; for the acceleration the Coriolis' term is also present.

The components of velocity and acceleration matrices are expressed in an arbitrary frame  and transform from one frame to another by the following rule

Dynamics

For the dynamics three further matrices are necessary to describe the inertia , the linear and angular momentum , and the forces and torques  applied to a body.

Inertia :

where  is the mass,  represent the position of the center of mass, and the terms  represent inertia and are defined as

 

Action matrix , containing force  and torque :

Momentum matrix , containing linear  and angular  momentum

All the matrices are represented with the vector components in a certain frame . Transformation of the components from frame  to frame  follows the rule

 

The matrices described allow the writing of the dynamic equations in a concise way.

Newton's law:
 
Momentum:
 

The first of these equations express the Newton's law and is the equivalent of the vector equation  (force equal mass times acceleration) plus  (angular acceleration in function of inertia and angular velocity); the second equation permits the evaluation of the linear and angular momentum when velocity and inertia are known.

Modified DH parameters 
Some books such as Introduction to Robotics: Mechanics and Control (3rd Edition)  use modified (proximal) DH parameters. The difference between the classic (distal) DH parameters and the modified DH parameters are the locations of the coordinates system attachment to the links and the order of the performed transformations.

Compared with the classic DH parameters, the coordinates of frame  is put on axis i − 1, not the axis i in classic DH convention.

Another difference is that according to the modified convention, the transform matrix is given by the following order of operations:

 

Thus, the matrix of the modified DH parameters becomes

 

As a consequence,  is formed only with parameters using the same subscript.

In some books, the order of transformation for a pair of consecutive rotation and translation (such as and ) is replaced. However, because matrix multiplication order for such pair does not matter, the result is the same. For example: .

Surveys of DH conventions and its differences have been published.

See also
 Forward kinematics
 Inverse kinematics
 Kinematic chain
 Kinematics
 Robotics conventions
 Mechanical systems

References

Robot control